Janthinobacterium lividum is an aerobic, Gram-negative, soil-dwelling bacterium that has a distinctive dark-violet (almost black) color, due to a compound called violacein, which is produced when glycerol is metabolized as a carbon source. Violacein has antibacterial, antiviral, and antifungal properties. Its antifungal properties are of particular interest, since J. lividum is found on the skin of certain amphibians, including the red-backed salamander (Plethodon cinereus), where it prevents infection by the devastating chytrid fungus (Batrachochytrium dendrobatidis).

Etymology
The genus name, Janthinobacterium, comes from Latin janthinus, which means "violet" or "violet-blue" + bacterium, which means rod or staff. The species name is also from Latin, lividum, which means "of a blue or leaden color".

Antifungal properties 
This bacterium produces antifungal compounds, such as indole-3-carboxaldehyde and violacein.

Resistance to B. dendrobatidis 
J. lividum inhibits the toxic effect and growth of the fungal genus Batrachochytrium. This fungus causes a disease known as chytridiomycosis in amphibians, and is contributing to the massive declines of amphibians around the world, so understanding the uses of these bacteria has been of major interest.

A study conducted in 2009 explored the effects of Bd and the use of J. lividium in the lab for survival. The three experimental treatments were: frogs infected with Bd, frogs given the bacterium J. lividium, and frogs with the given bacterium and then exposed to Bd. Nearly all of the frogs exposed to Bd alone experienced mortality, while none of the other treatments had any deaths. This effectively introduced the use of J. lividium as a possible method for Bd prevention in the lab setting.

Textile dyeing 
The pigment produced by J. lividum is also being used to colour textile. The biodegradable pigment could be an alternative to synthetic textile dyes that contain harmful chemicals and heavy metals.

References

External links
Type strain of Janthinobacterium lividum at BacDive -  the Bacterial Diversity Metadatabase

Burkholderiales
Bacteria described in 1978